Ivan Valladares (born 6 May 1965) is a Peruvian wrestler. He competed in the men's freestyle 68 kg at the 1984 Summer Olympics.

References

1965 births
Living people
Peruvian male sport wrestlers
Olympic wrestlers of Peru
Wrestlers at the 1984 Summer Olympics
Place of birth missing (living people)
20th-century Peruvian people